Langton by Wragby is a small village and civil parish in the East Lindsey district of Lincolnshire, England.

Langton Wood is a small, previously extra-parochial area, now included in the parish.

The church is dedicated to St Giles, and is of 14th-century origin, although it was rebuilt in 1866. It is a Grade II listed building.

Langton Court is the former vicarage, now a house, built in the middle of the 18th century with some 19th-century additions. It is a Grade II listed building.

The early 13th-century Archbishop of Canterbury, Stephen Langton, was the son of Henry Langton of Langton by Wragby, and may have been born in a moated farmhouse west of the church.

The "Stephen Langton Trail" devised to celebrate the 800th anniversary of the sealing of Magna Carta. It starts in Langton by Wragby and leads to Lincoln, where there is an original copy of the charter.

References

External links

Villages in Lincolnshire
Civil parishes in Lincolnshire
East Lindsey District